Phanos is a Dutch athletics club. Its home stadium is the Olympic stadium in Amsterdam.

History 
The club was founded in 1999–2000. The club was formed in a merger of two clubs, AV Sagitta (founded 1936) and AV Blauw Wit (founded 1917).

The name Phanos, meaning "torch" in Greek, refers to the "Marathon-tower" situated just outside the Olympic stadium, where in 1928 the Olympic fire burned.

Known athletes 
Since the founding of Phanos, the club has known many successful members. Some of today's successful members are as follows:

Men: Gert van Bergen, Bjorn Blauwhof, Jeroen Blommerde, Shaun Bownes, Maarten Bouwman, Harm Bruins, Patrick Cronie, Casper Dirks, Jerrel Feller, Akwasi Frimpong, Niels Geursen, Martijn Hoogendam, Guus Hoogmoed, Martijn Klaassen, Mike van Kruchten, Erik Leeflang, Jonathan Pengel, Maarten Persoon, Lindell Philip, Youssef el Rhalfioui, Tjendo Samuel, Koen Smet, Yoeri Stieglis, Robert Ton, Tom Uitslag, Marcel van der Westen, Dennis Tilburg, Rik Wester, Ben Vet, Peter Wolters, Daniël Lam, Yannick Mahieu, Jules de Bont, Yoshua Gül, and Jan Westerdiep.

Women:  Fabienne Aardenburg, Bianca Baak, Janice Babel, Bonne de Boer, Madiea Ghafoor, Joyce Huisman, Romy Kraaijeveld, Nicole Kroonenburg, Loreanne Kuhurima, Nicky Lam, Nicky van Leuveren, Kristijna Loonen, Nina Mathijssen, Lara Nicod, Jo-Ann Plet, Biance Reuver, Miriam van Reijen, Chanté Samuel, Jamile Samuel, Lisanne Schol, Paula Schouten, Kadene Vassel, Urta Rozenstruik and Wendy Visser.

Successful athletes from the past are:

Men:  Timothy Beck, Aziz Bougra, Maarten van Baardwijk, Marc de Vries, Thijs Feuth, Michel Kerkdijk, Daniël van Leeuwen, Erik Negerman, Martijn Nuijens, Bob Winter, Harvey Bijnaar, Bas de Vos, Abdi Nageeye and Dennis Licht.

Women:  Fanny Blankers-Koen, Angelique Hoogeveen-Smit, Janneke Hulshof, Ciska Janssen, Marjolein de Jong and Jolanda Keizer.

The most famous member of Phanos was Fanny Blankers-Koen, even though she was member of AV Sagitta and objected to the merger between Sagitta and Blauw Wit. Other honored athletes from Phanos are Hans Fokkens, Simon ter Laare, Tjerk Vellinga and Wim Visser.

Phanos medals at European championships and World championships

National Championship in Athletics 

Medals since 2000

External links
 Phanos

Sports clubs in Amsterdam
Athletics clubs in the Netherlands